Lee Cheol-uoo (born August 15, 1955), also spelled Lee Cheol-woo, is a former member of the National Assembly of South Korea. He was the vice-governor of  North Gyeongsang Province from  December 2005 to January 2008. He is currently the governor of North Gyeongsang Province.

Personal life
Lee was born in Gimcheon, Gyeongsangbuk-do, and attended the Kyungpook National University where he majored in mathematics education. He also graduated from the Graduate School of Public Administration at the Yonsei University, and was awarded an honorary doctorate of management by Daegu University in August 2007.

Career
Lee served as a member and manager of the National Intelligence Service for more than 20 years before becoming vice-governor. He spent almost five years as a teacher in a few middle schools before joining the NIS.

In the National Assembly, he is a member of the Intelligence Committee, Committee of Education, Science and Technology and the Special Committee of Budget and Account.

See also
Politics of South Korea
List of Koreans

References

External links

Members of the National Assembly (South Korea)
People from Gimcheon
People from North Gyeongsang Province
Living people
1955 births
Kyungpook National University alumni
Yonsei University alumni
Governors of North Gyeongsang Province
People Power Party (South Korea) politicians